Burgh-by-Sands railway station was originally named Burgh (pronounced "Bruff"). It opened in 1854 on the Port Carlisle Railway branch and later the Silloth branch, serving the village of Burgh in Cumberland - now Cumbria - England. The line and station closed on 7 September 1964 as part of the Beeching cuts.

In 2014 the station building survived as a private dwelling.

History 
In 1819 a port was constructed at Port Carlisle and in 1821, the Carlisle Navigation Canal was built to take goods to Carlisle. The canal was closed in 1853 and much of it was infilled by the Port Carlisle Railway Company who constructed a railway that started passenger services in 1854, discontinuing them two years later when the Carlisle & Silloth Bay Railway & Dock Company's (C&SBRDC) new railway to Silloth opened, utilising the Port Carlisle Branch as far as Drumburgh. Opened as Burgh railway station, it was renamed Burgh-by-Sands in 1923.

The North British Railway leased the line from 1862, it was absorbed by them in 1880, and then taken over by the London and North Eastern Railway in 1923.

Infrastructure
The station sat close the village, reached by Station Road that branched off the mainstreet; it had a single platform, a shelter and a signal box. The branch ran close to the course of Hadrians Wall. A substantial station building was present, together with a station master's house.

Micro-history
In the 1930s a Walter Tait was the station master.

References 
Notes

Sources

External links
 Burgh-by-Sands station Cumbria Railways
 Sentinel at Burgh-by-Sands Rail Brit
 The station and line Cumbria Gazetteer
 The station on an Edwardian 6" OS map National Library of Scotland
 The station Rail Maps Online
 The station (as "Burgh") and line, with mileages Railway Codes

Disused railway stations in Cumbria
Former North British Railway stations
Railway stations in Great Britain opened in 1854
Railway stations in Great Britain closed in 1964
Beeching closures in England
1854 establishments in England
Burgh by Sands